Skrim Kongsberg is a handball club from Kongsberg, Buskerud, Norway. The women's team currently compete in Eliteserien, the top division since its promotion in 2018. They are a part of IL Skrim.

References

External links
 Official website

Norwegian handball clubs
Handball clubs established in 1945
1945 establishments in Norway
Kongsberg